The state anthem of the Republic of Chuvashia, also simply referred to as "Oh Motherland", is the regional anthem of Chuvashia, a federal subject of Russia. Officially adopted by the state in 1997, the lyrics were written by Ille Toktash, and the music was composed by German Lebedev.

History

Earlier version
An idea aroused in 1905 about creating a new universal anthem. At the time, poet Yakov Turkhan wrote poems to the melody of the Russian Empire anthem, and he published them in the first issue of newspaper Hypar in January 1906.

In 1917, priest Taras Kirillov wrote and composed the poem "". Unsuccessful at first, leader of Chuvash choir in Kazan Tikhon Alekseyev created the anthem in 1918 which garnered support by the entire Chuvash intelligentsia. A version had a melody based on the "Anthem of Free Russia" composed by Aleksandr Grechaninov, and a subscript translation was preserved.

It was performed in January 1918 (after the end of the Russian Republic) by the Chuvash choir in Kazan after the premiere of the first national play by Maximovich-Koshkinsky, which was based on the play "Live Not as You Would Like To" by Alexander Ostrovsky.

Its popularity increased and it was performed on all significant events. However, it did not acquire an official status at the time.

Modern version
The modern version was based on the song "Oh Motherland", written in the mid-20th century by Chuvash poet Ille Tuktash and composed by Honored Artist of the RSFSR German Lebedev.

The composer German Lebedev created it for Pyotr Osipov's play "In His Motherland", which was staged at the Chuvash Academic Theater between 1944 and 1945. After the first performance, the audience was impressed. For the first time, the song acquired its status of an unofficial anthem of Chuvashia on 30 October 1950. Then, in the Hall of Columns of the House of Unions in Moscow, the 30th anniversary of the Chuvash Autonomous Soviet Socialist Republic was celebrated. At this solemn evening, the Chuvash State Song and Dance Ensemble performed a song accompanied by a symphony orchestra.

The song became an official anthem after the adoption on 1 July 1997 by the State Council of the Chuvash Republic of the Law "On State Symbols of the Chuvash Republic", approved and signed by the Head, Nikolay Fyodorov, on 14 July 1997.

April 29 is a holiday in the Chuvash Republic which celebrates the day of state symbols of the republic (anthem, emblem and flag – all of which have been celebrated since 2004). It was introduced by the Decree of the President of the Chuvash Republic on 8 April 2004, No. 24 "On the Day of State Symbols of the Chuvash Republic", and the Law of the Chuvash Republic on 19 April 2004, No. 1 "On the Day of State Symbols of the Chuvash Republic".

Lyrics

References

Notes

External links
Закон Чувашской Республики от 14 июля 1997 года № 12 «О государственных символах Чувашской Республики»

Chuvash
Regional songs
National anthem compositions in A major